Päivi Aulikki Aaltonen (born 29 January 1955) is a retired Finnish archer. She competed at the 1980, 1984 and 1988 Olympics and won an individual bronze medal in 1980. Between 1978 and 1985 she won four silver and two bronze medals at European championships. She was the Finnish champion in 1977–82 and 1987–88.

References 

1955 births
Living people
Sportspeople from Tampere
Finnish female archers
Olympic archers of Finland
Olympic bronze medalists for Finland
Archers at the 1980 Summer Olympics
Archers at the 1984 Summer Olympics
Archers at the 1988 Summer Olympics
Olympic medalists in archery
Medalists at the 1980 Summer Olympics